EndNote is a commercial reference management software package, used to manage bibliographies and references when writing essays, reports and articles.<noinclude> EndNote was written by Richard Niles, and ownership changed hands several times since it was launched in 1989 by Niles & Associates: in 2000 it was acquired by Institute for Scientific Information’s ResearchSoft Division, part of Thomson Corporation, and in 2016 by Clarivate (then named Clarivate Analytics).

Features 
EndNote groups citations into "libraries" with the file extension *.enl and a corresponding *.data folder.

There are several ways to add a reference to a library: manually, or by exporting, importing, copying from another EndNote library, or connecting from EndNote. The program presents the user with a window containing a dropdown menu from which to select the type of reference they require (e.g., book, congressional legislation, film, newspaper article, etc.), and fields ranging from the general (author, title, year) to those specific to the kind of reference (abstract, author, ISBN, running time, etc.)

Most bibliographic databases allow users to export references to their EndNote libraries. This enables the user to select multiple citations and saves the user from having to manually enter the citation information and the abstracts. Some databases (e.g., PubMed) requires the user to select citations, select a specific format, and save them as .txt files. The user can then import the citations into the EndNote software.  It is also possible to search library catalogs and free databases, such as PubMed, from within the EndNote software program itself.

If the user fills out the necessary fields, EndNote can automatically format the citation into any of over 2,000 different styles the user chooses.  For example, listed below are some citations from Gray's Anatomy using several different styles:

In Windows, EndNote creates a file with an *.enl extension, along with a *.data folder containing two MySQL files pdb.eni and sdb.eni. EndNote can be installed so that its features, like Cite While You Write, appear in the Tools menu of Microsoft Word and OpenOffice.org Writer.

EndNote can export citation libraries as HTML, plain text, Rich Text Format, or XML.
From version X.7.2, one library can be shared with up to 14 other EndNote users. The data is synchronized via the EndNote cloud service, with everybody having full write access to the library.

EndNote can also organize PDFs on the user's hard drive (or full text on the web) through links to files or by inserting copies of PDFs. It is also possible to save a single image, document, Excel spreadsheet, or other file type to each reference in an EndNote library. Starting from EndNote X version 1.0.1, formatting support for OpenDocument files (ODT) using the Format Paper command is supported.

History 
EndNote Version 1 was released as a ”Reference Database and Bibliography Maker” for Apple Macintosh in ca. 1989 by Niles & Associates (www.niles.com, currently defunct) of Emeryville/Berkley, CA at the list price of US$ 129 + shipping.  As one of the earlier reviews noted “EndNote is a citation manager, not a personal online catalog. Its focus is on inserting citations into written documents,” although it has had the “ability to import formatted references from other databases” from its very early days. However, starting with version 2 in ca. 1995 , reviewers considered EndNote as  “ a dual purpose program”, that “functions as a database manager and as a bibliography maker to insert citations into word processing documents and later compiles the bibliography in the required format.” Also, starting with version 2.1. EndNote has been available for Windows. The early versions of EndNote had a limit on the total number of references in a library to be under 32,000.

In 1992, there were four other products competing with EndNote: ProCite, Reference Manager, Papyrus and Bibilostax. In 1998-2015 Biblioscape was on this list as well. Zotero was added to this list in 2006 and Mendeley in 2008.  

With the release of version 4.0 in ca. 2000, EndNote attained most of its current functionality. In the same year EndNote was acquired by Institute for Scientific Information’s Research Soft Division, part of Thomson Corporation. Since then , i.e. for the last 20 years, EndNote’s functionality has not had any substantial changes. In 2016 EndNote was transferred from Thompson Reuters to a spin-off company, Clarivate.

George Mason University's Center for History and New Media had developed Zotero, a free/open-source extension to Mozilla Firefox. Thomson Reuters alleges that the Zotero developers reverse engineered and/or decompiled EndNote, that Zotero can transform proprietary EndNote citation style files (.ens) to the open Citation Style Language format, that they host files converted in this manner, and that they abuse the "EndNote" trademark in describing this feature. Thomson Reuters claims that this is violation of the site license agreement. They also added a restrictive click-thru license to their styles download website. George Mason University responded that it would not renew its site license for EndNote, that "anything created by users of Zotero belongs to those users, and that it should be as easy as possible for Zotero users to move to and from the software as they wish, without friction." The journal Nature editorialized that "the virtues of interoperability and easy data-sharing among researchers are worth restating. Imagine if Microsoft Word or Excel files could be opened and saved only in these proprietary formats, for example. It would be impossible for OpenOffice and other such software to read and save these files using open standards — as they can legally do." The case was dismissed on June 4, 2009.

EndNote Web 

EndNote Web, a web-based implementation of EndNote, offers integration with the ISI Web of Knowledge.

Import format 

EndNote can import records from other databases or text files. The latter are known as tagged import files and use a syntax based on Refer/BibIX. Fields are identified by a capital letter following a  sign, separated from its value by a single space. Discrete references are separated by a single empty line. These files are typically saved using the file extension .

%0 Book
%A Geoffrey Chaucer
%D 1957
%T The Works of Geoffrey Chaucer
%E F.
%I Houghton
%C Boston
%N 2nd

%0 Journal Article
%A Herbert H. Clark
%D 1982
%T Hearers and Speech Acts
%B Language
%V 58
%P 332-373

%0 Thesis
%A Cantucci, Elena
%T Permian strata in South-East Asia
%D 1990
%I University of California, Berkeley
%9 Dissertation

Tags and fields 
The complete map of EndNote tags for different reference types is available on GitHub.  Shown below are the abbreviated versions.

The table at the left is a list of EndNote tags and their associated field names.  The table at the right is a list of standard reference types for the  field.  Compare this scheme with the much older refer scheme which uses a similar syntax.  Entire records as separated by a single blank line.

Version history and compatibility 

Niles and Associates produced early versions of EndNote.<ref>
For example:
{{cite news
| title                 = EndNote
| url                   = https://books.google.com/books?id=6UNWdidjDmIC
| newspaper             = PC Mag
|date = 24 September 1991| volume                = 10
| issue                 = 16
| publisher             = Ziff Davis, Inc.
| publication-date      = 1991-09-24
| issn                  = 0888-8507
| access-date           = 2015-03-03
| quote                 = EndNote (Niles & Associates) [...] stores up to 32,000 references and creates bibliographies in any style you choose.
}}
</ref>
EndNote 20.2.1 for Windows, released on 30 November 2021.
EndNote 20.2 for Mac and Windows, released on 9 November 2021.
EndNote 20 for Windows released on 30 October 2020, with EndNote 20 for macOS to be released "soon".
EndNote X9.3.3 for Windows & Mac, released 28 April 2020.  Library files (i.e.'' citation databases) created with this version are in a different format to previous versions. Earlier versions of EndNote may not be able to read library files created with this version of EndNote.
EndNote X9.2 for Windows & Mac, released 11 June 2019.
EndNote X9.1.1 for Mac, released 29 March 2019.
EndNote X9.1 for Windows & Mac, released 12 March 2019.
EndNote X9 for Windows & Mac, released 1 August 2018.
EndNote X8.2 for Windows, released 9 January 2018.
EndNote X8 for Windows & Mac, released 8 November 2016.
EndNote X7.5 for Windows & Mac, released 2 February 2016.
EndNote X7.4 for Windows & Mac, released 11 August 2015.
EndNote X7.3 for Windows & Mac, released 1 April 2015.
EndNote X7.2 for Windows & Mac, released 30 September 2014.
EndNote X7.1 for Windows & Mac, released 2 April 2014.
EndNote X7.0.1 for Mac, released 13 November 2013.
EndNote X7.0.2 for Windows, released 23 October 2013.
EndNote X7 for Mac, released July 2013.
EndNote X7 for Windows, released 20 May 2013; Compatible with Microsoft Word 2013.
EndNote X6 for Windows, released 6 August 2012; EndNote X6 for Mac, released Q4 2012, compatible with OS X 10.8.
EndNote X5 for Mac, released September 2011, introduced official compatibility with OS X 10.7 Lion.
EndNote X5 for Windows, released 21 June 2011. Compatible with Microsoft Word 2010
EndNote X4 for Mac, released 23 August 2010. Introduced official compatibility with Mac OS X 10.6 Snow Leopard. Initially not compatible with Microsoft Office 2011, a compatibility update was subsequently made available on the EndNote website.
EndNote X4 for Windows, released 15 June 2010. Introduced official compatibility with Microsoft Windows 7. Introduced official compatibility with Microsoft Word 2010 (required an update via Help -> Program Updates, or directly from the Endnote website).
EndNote X3 for Mac, released 26 August 2009. Not compatible with Microsoft Word 2011. EndNote X3 and later are not supported on systems running Mac OS X 10.4 Tiger.
EndNote X3 for Windows, released 17 June 2009. Not compatible with Microsoft Word 2010; Word 2010 cannot be started without disabling the EndNote Addin.
EndNote X2 for Mac, released 3 September 2008.
EndNote X2 for Windows, released 11 June 2008. The "Cite While You Write" feature in EndNote X2 was originally not compatible with 64-bit versions of Windows, but a patch can fix this issue. Last update: Version 12.0.4 (build 4459).
EndNote X1 for Mac, released 21 August 2007. The Cite While You Write feature of EndNote X1 for Mac OS was originally only compatible with Word 10.1.2-10.1.6 and Word 2004. Due to changes in the way third party addins were supported in Word 2008, Cite While You Write was not natively compatible with Word 2008. A patch was released on June 26, 2008 that restored cite while you write functionality to Word 2008.
EndNote X1 for Windows, released 20 August 2007. EndNote X1 and later are compatible with Windows Vista.
EndNote X for Mac, released 25 August 2006. EndNote X and later are "Universal applications" that execute natively on both PPC and Intel-based Macs. Introduced compatibility with Mac OS X 10.5 Leopard. EndNote libraries that have been opened and used with EndNote version X or greater should not be subsequently used with an EndNote version earlier than version X.
EndNote X for Windows, released 9 June 2006. EndNote libraries that have been opened and used with EndNote version X or greater should not be subsequently used with an EndNote version earlier than version X.
EndNote 9 for Mac, released 29 August 2005. Introduced compatibility with Mac OS X 10.4 Tiger. Due to major compatibility issues, it is not recommend to run EndNote 9 or earlier on OS X 10.5 Leopard.
EndNote 9 for Windows, released 21 June 2005.
EndNote 8 for Mac, released 30 November 2004. Introduced compatibility with Mac OS X 10.3 Panther.
EndNote 8 for Windows, released 21 June 2004.
EndNote 7 for Mac, released 26 August 2003. Not certified compatible with OS X 10.3 Panther (users can install and run EndNote 7 on a Panther system, but there are some minor compatibility issues).
EndNote 7 for Windows, released 24 June 2003.
EndNote 6 for Mac, released 5 August 2002. Not certified compatible with OS X 10.3 Panther (it is possible to install and run EndNote 6 on a Panther system, but there are some minor compatibility issues).
EndNote 6 for Windows, released 17 June 2002.
EndNote 5 for Mac, released 19 July 2001. EndNote 5 and earlier are not compatible with any version of OS X.
EndNote 5 for Windows, released 11 June 2001.
EndNote 4 for Mac & Windows released 6 March 2000.
EndNote 3 for Mac & Windows released 10 March 1998.
EndNote 2 for Mac & Windows was probably released in the summer of 1995.
EndNote Plus for Mac

 See also Data schemes BibTeX – a text-based data format used by LaTeX
 refer – a similar, but not identical, data scheme supported on UNIX-like systems
 RIS – a text-based data scheme from Research Information SystemsSoftware'''
 Comparison of reference management software – compares EndNote to other similar software

References 

Reference management software
Bibliography file formats
Clarivate